Erasmus Saunders D.D. (d. 23 December 1775) was a Canon of Windsor from 1751 to 1756.

Family

He was the son of Erasmus Saunders, Canon of Brecon. He married Mary Kenrick and they had three children:
Martha Saunders (b. 1757)
Erasmus Saunders (b. 1759)
Kenrick Francis Saunders (b. 1764)

He died in 1775 and was buried in the south aisle of Bath Abbey.

Career

He was educated at Merton College, Oxford and graduated BA in 1737, MA in 1740, BD in 1751 and DD in 1753.

He was appointed:
Vicar of Wantage, Berkshire 1755
Prebendary of Rochester 1756
Vicar of St Martin-in-the-Fields 1756 - 1775
Vicar of Mapiscome, Kent 1757

He was appointed to the tenth stall in St George's Chapel, Windsor Castle in 1751 and held the canonry until 1756.

Notes 

1775 deaths
Canons of Windsor
Alumni of Merton College, Oxford
Year of birth unknown